Rebecca Anne Flint (born 5 June 1995), better known by her stage name Beckii Cruel, is a businesswoman, YouTuber, singer, and dancer from England. In 2010 she reached popularity in Japan after her YouTube videos of her dancing to dance pop songs were posted around the Internet. She was the 17th most subscribed user (3rd most in the Musician category) in Japan on YouTube as of 25 August 2010. Her YouTube account has reached 20 million upload views and over 100,000 subscribers. In March 2019, she co-founded Pepper Studio, an influencer marketing agency in London.

Early life

Flint was born in Blackpool, Lancashire, England, the daughter of a police inspector and a former dance instructor. She moved with her family at the age of 2 to Ramsey on the Isle of Man, where she attended Ramsey Grammar School. She became interested in anime and manga at the age of 11, when she first started reading Fruits Basket.

Career

YouTube
On 22 July 2007, Flint began a YouTube channel under the name "xBextahx" (from a nickname she had when she was younger). On 15 April 2009, she posted a video of herself dancing to "Danjo", a song by Taro that was turned into an Internet meme in Japan. Her YouTube video was uploaded to Nico Nico Douga, where she instantly attracted fans. Flint signed onto a talent agency, Life Is So Cruel, Ltd., in August 2009. Emerging under the stage name "Beckii Cruel" she flew to Japan, where she was able to perform with Taro in Akihabara. Although Cruel had experience in dancing, having taken ballet for most of her life, she was required to undergo vocal training. She began seeking advice from David Holland, an agent who also worked with Samantha Barks.

In October 2009, Cruel visited Japan and formed a group called the Cruel Angels, with 18-year-old French college student, known by her stage name Sarah Cruel, from Lyons, and a student from Portsmouth known by her stage name as Gemma Cruel. Her group was signed onto Tokuma Japan Communications, where they released their first single, on 10 February 2010.

Beckii appeared in an online campaign for Lotte Fit's in November 2009. On 9 December, she released her first idol DVD, titled This is Beckii Cruel!. It debuted at number 8 on Japan's DVD charts.

On 12 August 2010, BBC Three premiered a documentary about her, entitled Beckii: Schoolgirl Superstar at 14. As of September 2010, Cruel was no longer affiliated with the Cruel Angels, or with the Cruel Angels Project, citing a dispute with her management as the reason for her departure from the project.

Business interest

In March 2019, Flint co-founded Pepper Studio, an influencer marketing agency in London. Representing Pepper Studio, Flint has spoken to the media and at events about influencer marketing, including The Drum, Moneybox Live, The Today Programme, and The World Tonight on BBC Radio 4, and Sky News. She has spoken at events including Social Day and Digital Woman,

In 2017, Flint gave evidence to the House of Lords Select Committee on Communications for their inquiry into the advertising industry.

She has acted as a judge for the Social Media Marketing Awards in 2018 and 2019. She has also acted as a judge for the Influencer Marketing Awards in 2021.

In 2021, Flint was a recipient of Forbes 30 Under 30 Europe: Media & Marketing and appeared on the "How to earn a living on social media" episode of The Media Show on BBC News/BBC Radio 4 with Sam Yam, Kaya Yurieff and Chris Stokel-Walker.

Discography

Singles

As featured artist

Videography

References

External links

Official Website

21st-century Manx musicians
1995 births
Living people
English dance musicians
Manx musicians
Manx dance musicians
Japanese idols
English video bloggers
English YouTubers